Emilio De Marchi (born 12 April 1959) is an Italian film and television actor. He appeared in more than one hundred films in Italy and Germany since 1985.

Selected filmography

References

External links 

1959 births
Living people
Italian male film actors